Martin Kelsey Brokenleg is a psychologist and author in the fields of trauma, resilience, and Native American studies. An enrolled member of the Rosebud Sioux Tribe, he was a professor of Native American studies at Augustana University in South Dakota for 30 years. He also served as professor and director of the native ministries programme at the Vancouver School of Theology from 2004 to 2009.

Brokenleg is known for the Circle of Courage, an influential model of positive youth development first presented by Brokenleg and Larry Brendtro in 1988. The framework posits that there are four universal needs and values that are essential for young people's growth: belonging, mastery, independence, and generosity. The model has been widely used in educational, treatment, and youth work settings and received the Albert E. Trieschman award for contribution to the child and youth care literature.

References

External links
 

20th-century American Episcopal priests
21st-century American Episcopal priests
21st-century American psychologists
Anglo-Catholic clergy
Augustana University people
Episcopal Divinity School alumni
Living people
Native American academics
Rosebud Sioux people
South Dakota State University alumni
University of South Dakota alumni
Academic staff of the Vancouver School of Theology
Year of birth missing (living people)
20th-century American psychologists